is a Japanese politician serving in the House of Representatives in the Diet (national legislature) as a member of the Initiatives from Osaka party. A native of Osaka Prefecture and graduate of Kansai University he was elected for the first time in 1989 after an unsuccessful run in 1986.

References

External links
 Official website in Japanese.

Living people
1947 births
Liberal Democratic Party (Japan) politicians
Members of the House of Representatives (Japan)
Kansai University alumni
Nippon Ishin no Kai politicians
21st-century Japanese politicians